The Road to Return is a recording by guitarist Michael Hedges released on the Windham Hill label. It features eight vocal arrangements and two instrumentals.

Reception

Music critic Jason Anderson, writing for Allmusic, wrote the album "Fans of the musician's stunning two-handed, alternate-tuned guitar innovations were a little disappointed by the relatively minimal Road to Return, with its accent on Hedges' newfound vocal stylings."

Track listing
All compositions by Michael Hedges except as noted.

 "Prelude" – 3:05
 "Road to Return" – 6:03
 "Communicate" – 4:09
 "Sister Soul" – 4:34
 "Guardian's Trust" (Hedges, Cate McNider) – 3:48
 "India" – 3:55
 "A Midwinter Night's Dream" – 5:36
 "Follow Through" – 3:43
 "You Can Have Anything You Want" – 3:49
 "Road Music" – 2:15

Personnel
Michael Hedges – guitar, vocals, bass, keyboards, drums, alto flute, harmonica
Pipa Pinon – chant vocals
Janeen Rae Heller – saw

Production notes
Produced and engineered by Michael Hedges
Mastered by Bernie Grundman

References 

1994 albums
Michael Hedges albums
Windham Hill Records albums